Chen Xiumei (born 21 February 1966) is a Chinese sailor. She competed in the women's 470 event at the 1988 Summer Olympics.

References

External links
 

1966 births
Living people
Chinese female sailors (sport)
Olympic sailors of China
Sailors at the 1988 Summer Olympics – 470
Place of birth missing (living people)
Asian Games medalists in sailing
Sailors at the 1994 Asian Games
Medalists at the 1994 Asian Games
Asian Games gold medalists for China
20th-century Chinese women